Mahmoud El Maghriby (born May 16, 1987) is an Egyptian professional footballer who currently plays as a left winger for the Egyptian club El Raja SC. In 2017, he renewed his contract with Raja for 3 years.

References

1987 births
Living people
El Raja SC players
Egyptian footballers
Association football midfielders